The 1994 Rice Owls football team represented Rice University during the 1994 NCAA Division I-A football season. The Owls, led by first-year head coach Ken Hatfield, played their home games at Rice Stadium in Houston, Texas. The most notable win of the season was Rice's victory over Texas, their first victory over the Longhorns since 1965 along (as of 2022) their last victory over Texas. Due to Texas A&M being under sanctions from the NCAA, the Owls, along with Texas, Baylor, TCU, and Texas Tech, were all named co-champions of the Southwest Conference; all five teams had 4–3 conference win–loss records. This was Rice's first conference championship since 1957. Rice would not win another conference title until 2013, when it was a member of Conference USA.

Schedule

References

Rice
Rice Owls football seasons
Southwest Conference football champion seasons
Rice Owls football
Rice Owls football